Martin Hlinka (born 25 September 1976) is a Slovak former professional ice hockey player. He last played for the St. Charles Chill in the Central Hockey League (CHL). In April 2021 he was announced as Director of Youth Hockey for the Seattle Kraken. Prior to joining the Kraken he served as an assistant coach for the Canisius Golden Griffins in the AHA conference of the NCAA, following spells coaching clubs in Russia and Austria, and with youth international teams of Belarus and Poland.

Career statistics

References

External links

1976 births
Living people
Augsburg Auggies men's ice hockey players
Chicago Wolves (IHL) players
Hannover Scorpions players
Hershey Bears players
Kassel Huskies players
Portland Pirates players
Quad City Mallards (UHL) players
St. Charles Chill players
Slovak ice hockey forwards
Ice hockey people from Bratislava
Slovak expatriate ice hockey players in the United States
Slovak expatriate ice hockey players in Germany
Slovak ice hockey coaches
Seattle Kraken personnel
Slovak expatriate ice hockey people
Slovak expatriate sportspeople in Austria
Slovak expatriate sportspeople in Russia
Slovak expatriate sportspeople in Belarus
Slovak expatriate sportspeople in Poland